Purusha Lakshanam is a 1993 Indian Tamil-language drama film, written and directed by K. S. Ravikumar from a story by P. Vasu. The film stars Jayaram and Khushbu. It was released on 3 December 1993. The film was remade as Bhale Pellam in Telugu and in Mangalya Bandhana in Kannada.

Plot 
Nandagopal works as a managing director in a company. Abhirami, also known as Ammu, a carefree college student, falls in love with Nandagopal at first sight, while Anju also loves Nandagopal, but it is one sided. Finally, Nandagopal accepts to get married with Ammu. Raja was Ammu's classmate and was in love with Ammu, so Raja wants to take revenge on Ammu. Raja begins to compel Ammu, and challenges to marry her. One day, Raja hugs Ammu in front of Nandagopal, Nandagopal thinks that his wife has an affair with Raja and he expels Ammu. What transpires later forms the crux of the story.

Cast 
Jayaram as Nandagopal
Khushbu as Abhirami (Ammu)
Anju Prabakar  as Anju
R. Sundarrajan as Rajgopal
Srividya as Vidya
Raja Ravindra as Raja
Charle as Rajesh
K. S. Ravikumar as Madhavan Nair
Idichapuli Selvaraj
Loose Mohan
Major Sundarrajan
Thyagu
Pandu
Kumarimuthu
Shanmugasundari as Shanmugasundari
Indraja

Production 
P. Vasu wrote the story with Khushbu in mind, and she accepted. Though Khusbhu had fever on the first day of shooting, she concealed this from director K. S. Ravikumar to prevent production delays.

Soundtrack 
The music was composed by Deva and lyrics were written by Kalidasan.

Reception 
The Indian Express wrote "P. Vasu's story gets a serious turn, the director gets a grip [..] and the film manages to keep the viewers engrossed in the proceedings." New Straits Times praised Khushboo's performance and praised Ravikumar's direction citing he "has managed to keep the pace light and full of delightful moments for first three quarters of the movie". Kalki wrote that the film was moving at a brisk pace despite having elements like Thaali sentiment and devotional song.

References

External links 
 

1990s Tamil-language films
1993 drama films
1993 films
Films directed by K. S. Ravikumar
Films scored by Deva (composer)
Indian drama films
Tamil films remade in other languages